Manchester United Football Club is a professional football club based in Old Trafford, Greater Manchester, England. The club was formed in Newton Heath in 1878 as Newton Heath LYR F.C., and played their first competitive match in October 1886, when they entered the First Round of the 1886–87 FA Cup. The club was renamed Manchester United F.C. in 1902, and moved to Old Trafford in 1910.

From the beginning of the club's official managerial records in 1892 to the start of the 2022–23 season, Manchester United have had 23 full-time managers. The current manager is Erik ten Hag who took over from interim manager Ralf Rangnick on 23 May 2022.

The longest-serving and most successful person to manage Manchester United is Sir Alex Ferguson, who won 13 Premier League titles, five FA Cups, four League Cups, 10 Community Shields, two UEFA Champions League titles, one UEFA Cup Winners' Cup, one UEFA Super Cup, one Intercontinental Cup and one FIFA Club World Cup in his managerial reign of more than 26 years.

Managerial history
From 1878 to 1914, the team was selected by a committee whose secretary had the same powers and role as a manager has today. There were four secretaries during this period, A. H. Albut, James West, Ernest Mangnall and John Bentley.

Ernest Mangnall was the first man to bring any major silverware to the club, winning the club's first ever Football League title in 1908. This was followed by the FA Cup the following season, and another league title in 1911. Despite this success, though, he left the club a year later to join local rivals Manchester City. Coincidentally, Mangnall's last match in charge of United was the Old Trafford derby of 7 September 1912. John Bentley took over as club secretary, but was replaced two years later by Jack Robson, who became the club's first full-time manager. He remained in the post for seven years, but resigned in December 1921 after succumbing to a bout of pneumonia.

Robson was followed soon after by John Chapman. However, in Chapman's first season at the club, they were relegated to the Second Division for the first time since 1906. Three years in the Second Division followed, before promotion back to the First Division. After guiding the club to 9th place in the league and the FA Cup semi-finals in 1925–26, Chapman received a telegram from the Football Association on 8 October 1926 informing him of his suspension from management for the rest of the season; no reason was given. Half-back Lal Hilditch took over for the remainder of the season, before Herbert Bamlett took permanent control.

Bamlett was manager for four years, but was unable to muster any success, the club's highest position during his reign being 12th. The club was relegated to the Second Division again in 1931, and Bamlett was replaced by club secretary Walter Crickmer. This was Crickmer's first of two spells as manager of the club, retaining his position as secretary all the while. It lasted only a season, though, as he failed to return the club to the First Division. In June 1932, Scott Duncan was appointed as manager, but in his second season in charge he led the club to what remains a club record lowest League position; 20th in the Second Division. The club held faith in Duncan though, and he managed to get the club back into the First Division by 1936. However, the club was relegated again the following year, and Walter Crickmer resumed control until the end of the Second World War.

Before the end of the war, the club approached Matt Busby, who had just turned down the opportunity to join the coaching staff at Liverpool, on the grounds that he wanted more responsibility over the playing side of the club than merely the selection of the team. United allowed Busby the responsibilities he requested, and in his first five seasons in charge he guided the team to four second-place finishes in the league, before finally winning his first title in 1952. He soon set about replacing many of the more experienced players with a group of youths who came to be known as the "Busby Babes". This team went on to win two league titles in 1955–56 and 1956–57, as well as reaching two FA Cup finals. Unfortunately, the careers of many of the players were cut short by the Munich air disaster, which also left Busby fighting for his life.

While Busby was in hospital recovering from the injuries he sustained in the air crash, his managerial duties were left to his assistant, Jimmy Murphy. After Busby recovered, he set about rebuilding his side, and within five years, in 1963, he had won the FA Cup for the first time in 15 years. This was followed up by two league titles in three years, and then the greatest prize in European club football, the European Cup. He continued as manager for one more year after this success, leaving his managerial duties to club trainer Wilf McGuinness. McGuinness struggled in his new post, however, and Busby was convinced to return for the second half of the 1970–71 season. However, he retired from football permanently that summer, and was succeeded that summer by Frank O'Farrell. O'Farrell's stay was short-lived, though, as his inability to control George Best's extravagances forced the board to sack him with three years still to run on his contract.

O'Farrell's replacement was to be Scotland coach, Tommy Docherty. Docherty left the Scotland job and his first task at United was to keep the club in the top flight. He managed it once, but he was unable to pull it off again and the club was relegated in 1973–74. They bounced straight back up the following season, though, and in their first season back in the top flight, the team cruised to a third-place finish and yet another FA Cup final. The next year, they went one better, beating Liverpool in the final to claim his first and only trophy at Old Trafford. It was soon discovered, however, that Docherty was having an affair with the wife of the club's physiotherapist, and he was immediately fired, replaced by Queens Park Rangers' manager Dave Sexton.

Sexton remained in the United job for four years, but was unable to produce any silverware, and was replaced in 1981 by Ron Atkinson. Atkinson was able to rekindle the club's cup success, leading his side to two FA Cups in his five-year tenure. He also oversaw a series of respectable finishes in the league, but after his disastrous start to the 1986–87 season, he was sacked. His replacement, Alex Ferguson, had, in recent years, become the first manager to break the dominance of Rangers and Celtic in the Scottish league for over 15 years, winning the Scottish Premier Division title with Aberdeen three times in six years, as well as finishing as runner-up twice and winning the European Cup Winners' Cup in 1983.

During his tenure, Ferguson was credited with the distinction of making some of the most shrewd purchases in the club's history, including the signings of Peter Schmeichel and Eric Cantona, each for less than £1.5 million. With these signings, combined with the club's many experienced players, Ferguson brought a European title in 1991 – first in 23 years, the club's first ever League Cup in 1992, and the league title for the first time in 26 years the next year. In the following decade, he won the Premier League title another six times, including a hat-trick of titles from 1999 to 2001, a feat that no other manager has yet achieved with the same club. In 1999, he also led the club to an unprecedented treble of Premier League, FA Cup and UEFA Champions League. Subsequently, he added another three league titles to his trophy haul, despite a number of promises of retirement. Ferguson won his 10th Premier League title in the 2007–08 season, and followed this up with his second Champions League title 10 days later. In 2008–09, Ferguson guided United to another Premier League title, making Manchester United the only club and him the only manager to have won the English league title three times in a row twice. His 12th title, in the 2010–11 season, was United's 19th overall, overtaking Liverpool's record of 18. Ferguson won his 13th and final league title in the 2012–13 season, making 20 titles overall for United. Near the end of the season, Ferguson announced his retirement, and he was replaced by Everton manager David Moyes.

In his first match, Moyes gave United their 20th Community Shield and his first trophy as United manager; however, after failing to lead the club to Champions League qualification, he was sacked before the end of his first season, with Ryan Giggs taking temporary charge for the final four games of the 2013–14 season where the club finished seventh, their lowest league finish since the establishment of the Premier League. Netherlands manager Louis van Gaal was appointed as Moyes' permanent replacement on 19 May 2014, taking charge after the end of the 2014 FIFA World Cup. In his inaugural season, United signed many prominent players and returned to the Champions League with a 4th-place finish. In his second season, United finished in 5th place behind Manchester City, out of Champions League position, but won the 2015–16 FA Cup, the club's first in a dozen years. The board, however, decided that not enough progress had been made from the previous season and Van Gaal was sacked on 23 May 2016, just two days after lifting the cup. He was replaced by two-time European champion and two-time Chelsea boss José Mourinho four days later. Mourinho became United's fourth manager (including Giggs) in as many years since Ferguson's retirement. He won the League Cup and Europa League in his first season – the first UEFA Europa League title in the club's history and thus completing the UEFA treble, but failed to win any silverware in 2017–18 as United finished second in both the league and FA Cup. He was sacked on 18 December 2018 after the team won just seven of their opening 17 matches of the 2018–19 season. Former club forward Ole Gunnar Solskjær was appointed as caretaker manager for the rest of the season. On 19 January 2019, Solskjær won his seventh out of seven games in charge of United, a new club record, and on 28 March 2019, following victory over Paris Saint-Germain in the Champions League, Solskjær was given the job permanently. He became the first former United player to manage the club permanently since Wilf McGuinness. On 21 November 2021, Solskjær left his post as the first full-time manager since Frank O'Farrell to not win a trophy for United, just like McGuinness did, and was replaced by first-team coach Michael Carrick on caretaking basis until 2 December 2021. German Ralf Rangnick was appointed interim manager until the end of the season.

On 21 April 2022, Erik ten Hag was announced as the new full-time manager. On 26 February 2023, he successfully brought United to their first competitive trophy in nearly six years as they won the EFL Cup final against Newcastle United.

Statistics
Information correct after match played on 19 March 2023. Only competitive matches are counted.
Table headers
 Nationality – If the manager played international football as a player, the country/countries he played for are shown. Otherwise, the manager's nationality is given as their country of birth.
 From – The year of the manager's first game for Manchester United.
 To – The year of the manager's last game for Manchester United.
 P – The number of games managed for Manchester United.
 W – The number of games won as a manager.
 D – The number of games drawn as a manager.
 L – The number of games lost as a manager.
 GF – The number of goals scored under his management.
 GA – The number of goals conceded under his management.
 Win% – The total winning percentage under his management.
 Honours – The trophies won while managing Manchester United.
Key
 (n/a) = Information not available
 p = Player-manager

Notes

References

External links

Managers at ManUtd.com
Managers at StretfordEnd.co.uk

 
Managers
Manchester United